The Ricecookers is an alternative rock band formed in Boston by Tomomi (A.K.A. Tomo) Hiroishi, Kota Fujii, Daisuke Wakabayashi and Sohei Oyama. Tomo was born and raised in Mexico City, while the rest of the band grew up in Japan. They met while studying at the Berklee College of Music in Massachusetts and formed the band in 2004.

The Ricecookers’ songs are written by Tomo Hiroishi and Kota Fujii in English and Japanese. Each band member brings different influences from a variety of genres including blues, funk, techno, and jazz to their sound. Tokyo Calendar  said that "Their deep understanding of modern music, learned at the prestigious Berklee College of Music, is reflected in their strong yet sensitive progressive rock sound.” Their performance is memorable with Tomomi Hiroishi's hard yet transparent voice, while the powerful and beautiful sound is created by Daisuke Wakabayashi, Sohei Oyama and Kota Fujii. The band is known for their explosive live performance.

History

2004~2008 (Early Years) 

The band members enrolled at Berklee College of Music from separate paths, but soon met and became close friends.  In 2004, Tomomi Hiroishi asked Kota Fujii and Masaki Minami to start a rock band hoping to bring together their interest in different genres of music. Original members of The Ricecookers were Tomomi Hiroishi (vocals, guitar), Kota Fujii (guitar), Masaki Minami (guitar), Daisuke Wakabayashi (bass), and Tom Ulichny (drums).  The band performed at a wide range of venues in Boston and surrounding areas, most of their music inspired by groups like Rage Against the Machine, Stevie Ray Vaughan, Maceo Parker and Audioslave.  In 2006, Masaki Minami decided to go back to Japan leaving the band, and Sohei Oyama replaced Tom Ulichny as the official drummer; creating The Ricecookers as we know them today. That same year, they released their first self-produced album, “1st Blood” in the United States.

2008~ 

In 2008, The Ricecookers met New York producer Shunji Okada, and collaborated to record their first EP, Four of Our Songs. They participated in events such as Japan Day @ Central Park, to broaden their horizons.  As they worked towards becoming known in the New York area, they debuted in the spring of 2010 in Japan, on a Tokyo tour where film director Yukihiko Tsutsumi saw their performance, purely by chance, and quickly bought the rights to their song Nami No Yukisaki for his upcoming television drama series, “Spec” on Tokyo Broadcasting System Television Network in Japan.  The Ricecookers made history in Japan by becoming the first unknown indie band to be featured as the theme song for a drama series.  The media described their dramatic debut as a “never before seen miracle”, and they were also the very first band to custom produce different versions of the same song to fit each episode of the series.

After the tour, The Ricecookers returned to the United States and relocated to New York City from Boston, where they recorded their second EP, Chacmool.  Soon after its release in September 2010, “Chacmool” became the #1 selling alternative rock album on iTunes Japan.  The Ricecookers once again traveled to Japan for their second tour, this time hitting 5 different cities throughout the country. They also started a two-band eventcalled “Under the Shoes” with another Japanese rock band called, Response.  Their final event at Star Lounge in Tokyo was filmed and aired on BS Fuji TV Network and later released on DVD.

On October 8, 2010, their single Nami No Yukisaki aired on a Friday night weekly drama series on TBS Network, “Spec” as its theme song.  Along with the premiere of the program, the band became the #7 most searched keyword on GOOGLE Japan.  In December 2010, Anchor Records released the 10 different bilingual versions of Nami no Yukusaki and its music video as a CD-DVD set titled Nami no Yukusaki TV Special Collection.  This CD ranked #1 on the Indie Album & Single Sales Chart on the Billboard JAPAN and #6 on Oricon Charts.  During the same month, The Ricecookers travelled to Japan for their last tour of the year, and once again hosted “Under the Shoes Vol. 2” event in Tokyo.  They ended the tour headlining for the “Spec Final Episode Event” at Akasaka Blitz in Tokyo.  Live recordings from this performance along with their new single, “Lost Raven”, was released by Anchor Records as a mini album titled, Eat, Breathe and Live in April 2011.

Shortly after its release, “Lost Raven” was featured as the theme song for the Japanese variety show, “Summers no Yaritaga☆ga~ri~” airing weekly on Thursday nights on the TBS Network.  The release of this album caught the eye of a renowned Bi-Lingual magazine called Commons & Sense man, who interviewed The Ricecookers, furthering the acknowledgment of the band to a wider audience.
In July 2011, The Ricecookers released their first album entitled sélf.  The album was produced by Shunji Okada, recorded by Ted Young and Kabir Hermon, and was mastered by the Grammy Award Winner George Marino.  During the same month, The Ricecookers went on their fourth tour to Japan and held their first 90-minute solo-performances titled, “The Ricecookers self-ish” at La.mama in Tokyo and Taku Taku in Kyoto.  Following their solo performance, they returned to New York and attended their first CMJ Music Marathon, which was followed by a nomination in the “Independent Artist of the Year 2011” category by Billboard Japan.

In April 2012, they released Showtime in Japan, and Paradise in the US at the same time.  This release was followed by another Japanese CD release, under the title  Pied Piper.   In 2012, the TV drama series "Spec" debuted its first movie, in which The Ricecookers performed yet another version of Nami No Yukusaki.  Due to the band contributing the theme song for the movie as well as the TV series, they were invited to the movie premiere event, which was held in Tokyo. 2012 was also the year they performed at Rising Sun Rock Festival in Japan, becoming one of the many celebrated artists from Japan, performing at this highly recognized event.  Ending the year with a bang, The Ricecookers appeared on a famous Japanese year end countdown TV show titled Count Down TV, broadcast live throughout Japan, ringing-in 2013 on live TV.

Starting in 2013, The Ricecookers have been participating in a charitable music event in New York every March, to raise fund for the 2011 Tōhoku earthquake and tsunami victims and survivors.  of the real was also released in 2013, and stirred up some buzz, as they got the famous Akihiro Nishino, a Japanese comedian/clay animation artist to create a Music Video for them.  2013 was also the year in which The Ricecookers went on the "Standing Egg Tour", where they toured 4 major states in the East Coast, including their home ground New York, and the band's birthplace Boston.  The Ricecookers went on the Standing Egg Tour with Uzuhi, another New York based punk rock band and Kagero, a punk jazz band directly imported from Japan for this tour.  The tour was a mixture of various types of music, one normally would not have the chance to see on the same stage on the same night, thus making it a success.  The event was covered by various Japanese media.  After performing at CMJ Music Marathon again that year, they released their latest full album parallax in Japan.  This latest product is available not only in Japan but in America as well, via iTunes America starting in 2014.

In 2014, the band was invited to perform for the long running charity event held in New York City titled Rock For Hope, where all the proceeds will be donated to fund the educational programs for financially underprivileged children in China. The summer of 2014 also marked the bands Otakon debut.  The Ricecookers were invited by the famous Otakon held at the Baltimore Convention Center every year to perform.  The convention was kicked off with an event titled "Matsuri", which the band performed in.  The next day, the band performed again, with an acoustic set.  Their performance at the Otakon collided with the release of The Ricecookers' newest EP titled "Again and Again".

In January 2015, the band was invited to perform at KotoriCon at Rowan College at Gloucester County in Sewell, New Jersey.

Discography 
Four of Our Songs (January 2010)
Label: BAJ Inc.
Chacmool (September 2010)
Label: BAJ Inc.
Distribution: Universal Music LLC/IMS
Nami no Yukusaki (October 2010)
Label: Anchor Records
Distribution: Sony Music
Nami no Yukusaki TV Special Collection CD-DVD Set (December 2010)
Label: Anchor Records
Distribution: Sony Music
Eat, Breathe and Live (April 2011)
Label:Anchor Records
Distribution:Sony Music
【sélf】 (July 2011)
Label: BAJ Inc.
Distribution: Universal Music LLC/IMS
 Showtime (April 2012)
Label: Anchor Records
Distribution: Sony Music
Paradise (March 2012)
Label: Zazou Productions, Inc.
Distribution: Sony Music
PIED PIPER (September 2012)
Label: Anchor Records
Distribution:Sony Music
Muriyari (December 2012)
Label: Anchor Records
Distribution: Sony Music
Of the real (May 2013)
Label: Anchor Records
Distribution: Sony Music
Parallax (December 2013)
Label: Anchor Records
Distribution: Sony Music

References

External links 
 

Alternative rock groups from Massachusetts
Musical groups from Boston
Musical groups established in 2004